DC3 (also known as D.C. 3) was an American rock and roll band formed by singer, songwriter and guitarist Dez Cadena in 1983 and active until 1988.

Cadena had been a member of California-based punk rock group Black Flag from about 1980 to 1983, first as singer, then as rhythm guitarist.

Dez Cadena formed DC3 with drummer, Kurt Markham and bassist, Kira Roessler, who practiced with the band early on before joining Black Flag. Once Kira left to play with Black Flag, her replacement was her older brother, Paul Roessler (Los Angeles Screamers), played bass and keyboards for DC3.

Their debut album, This Is The Dream, was released in 1985 on SST Records and featured a major Black Sabbath influence with very little of the hardcore or punk stylings of Black Flag. The album is particularly notable for the songs "I Believe It" and "Ain't No Time Here Now", which were originally written and played live by Black Flag and are also present on that band's The Complete 1982 Demos Plus More as "Yes I Know" (identical lyrics to the DC3 version) and "What Can You Believe" (different lyrics than the DC3 version, but nearly identical music).

Later albums found DC3 reducing the Black Sabbath influence, but there was still a prominent 1970s hard rock sound, with the band doing a cover song of the Jack Bruce/Mountain song "Theme for an Imaginary Western" for an SST compilation.

Despite the name "DC3", the band was only a trio for their first LP.  Bassist Ceasar Viscarra and drummer Louie Dufau (both formerly of The Stains) joined Cadena and Roessler after the release of the first album and the band remained a quartet for the until their break-up.

DC3 split in 1988.  Vida (1989), a collection of live recordings, was DC3's last album.

Discography
This Is The Dream LP (SST Records, 1985)
The Good Hex LP (SST Records, 1986)
You're Only As Blind As Your Mind Can Be LP (SST Records, 1986)
Vida 2xLP/CD (SST Records, 1989)

Members

Final line-up
Dez Cadena - Vocals, Guitar
Paul Roessler - Keyboards, Vocals
Ceasar Viscarra - Bass
Louie Dufau - Drums

Previous members
Kurt Markham - Drums on ''This Is The Dream ‘’
Kira Roessler - Bass (early practices)

References

External links
DC3 @ TrouserPress
[ DC3 @ AMG Allmusic]

American rock music groups
SST Records artists